Clarence H. Carter may refer to:

 Clarence Holbrook Carter (1904–2000), American artist
 Clarence H. Carter (Wisconsin politician) (1875–1958), member of the Wisconsin State Assembly